Kwee is a Chinese-Indonesian surname, based on the Dutch romanization in Java, Indonesia of Chinese surname Guo. It may refer to:

 Kwee family of Ciledug, an historic family of the 'Cabang Atas' or Chinese gentry of colonial Indonesia.
 Kwee family (Pontiac), a Singaporean business family of Chinese-Indonesian descent.
 Kwee Family (2TANG), an Indonesian business family.